Anders Thiset (25 February 1850 -14 July 1917) was a Danish historian, genealogist, heraldic artist, archivist and encyclopedist.

Biography
Thiset was born in Copenhagen, Denmark.
He was a student of  H.E. Melchior (1881-1927) and completed Melchiors Borgerskole  with a preliminary examination in 1864. He b'Danske adelige Brevkister (1897). He is most known for publishing Danmarks Adels Aarbog'' from 1884 together with journalist H.R. Hiort

References

19th-century Danish historians
20th-century Danish historians
 
Danish genealogists
Danish archivists
Encyclopedists
People from Copenhagen
1850 births
1917 deaths
Knights of the Order of the Dannebrog